Matt Mullican (born September 18, 1951) is an American artist and educator. He is the child of artists Lee Mullican and Luchita Hurtado. Mullican lives and works in both Berlin and New York City.

Early life and education 
Matt Mullican was born on September 18, 1951 in Santa Monica, California to parents Lee Mullican and Luchita Hurtado. His mother was Venezuelan-born. In childhood he lived in Caracas, Venezuela for one year. 

Mullican received his BFA degree from California Institute of the Arts (CalArts) in 1974.

Career 
He rose to prominence as a member of The Pictures Generation along with such artists as Troy Brauntuch, Jack Goldstein, David Salle, James Welling, Sherrie Levine, Cindy Sherman, Louise Lawler, Richard Prince and Robert Longo. His work is concerned with systems of knowledge, meaning, language, and signification. Mullican also works with the relationship between perception and reality, between the ability to see something and the ability to represent it.

Since the 1970s, Mullican has been known for his performances done while under hypnosis. During these performances, Mullican channels an alter ego known as 'That Person', who displays extreme and erratic behavior. Drawings made by Mullican while hypnotized are frequently exhibited and attributed to 'That Person'. 

Mullican's work has been exhibited nationally and internationally since the early 1970s at venues including The Metropolitan Museum of Art, New York, Haus Der Kunst, Munich, Germany, the National Galerie, Berlin, Germany, the Stedelijk Museum, Schiedam, Netherlands, Museum of Contemporary Art, Los Angeles, CA, and The Museum of Modern Art, NY.  Mullican's work has been reviewed in Artforum, the Frankfurter Allgemeine Zeitung, The New York Times, and Modern Painters, among others. Mullican has been exhibited in 2017 on the Petit Palais' facade in Paris during the FIAC art fair with his giant piece of art "For Worlds Between Five".

Teaching 
Mullican was a professor at the University of Fine Arts of Hamburg (German: Hochschule für bildende Künste Hamburg) in Hamburg, Germany from 2009 to 2018. He has also taught and lectured at Columbia University; The School of Visual Arts; the Rijksakademie in Amsterdam; The London Institute; and the Chelsea College of Art and Design.

References

Further reading

External links 
  Tracy Williams, LTD. Artist's page
  Artforum, interview with the artist
  Podcast with Matt Mullican, 2015

1951 births
Living people
Artists from Santa Monica, California
Academic staff of the University of Fine Arts of Hamburg
American people of Venezuelan descent